The Belarusian Labour Party (Biełaruskaja Partyja Pracy) is a social-democratic political party in Belarus, that opposes the government of president Alexander Lukashenko. The leader of the party is Alaksandar Buchvostaŭ.

At the last legislative elections, 13–17 October 2004, the party was part of the People's Coalition 5 Plus (Narodnaya Kaalicyja Piaciorka Plus), which failed to secure a seat. These elections fell significantly short of OSCE commitments, according to the OSCE/ODIHR Election Observation Mission. Universal principles and constitutionally guaranteed rights of expression, association and assembly were seriously challenged, calling into question the Belarusian authorities' willingness to respect the concept of political competition on a basis of equal treatment. According to this mission principles of an inclusive democratic process, whereby citizens have the right to seek political office without discrimination, candidates to present their views without obstruction, and voters to learn about them and discuss them freely, were largely ignored.

On August 2, 2004, the Supreme Court of Belarus liquidated the Belarusian Labour Party, and in 2005 some members split from the party to form the Belarusian Social Democratic Party (Assembly).

The party does not have a website.

References

1993 establishments in Belarus
2009 disestablishments in Belarus
Banned socialist parties
Defunct social democratic parties
Defunct socialist parties in Europe
Labour parties
Observer parties of the Socialist International
Political parties disestablished in 2009
Political parties established in 1993
Political parties in Belarus
Social democratic parties in Belarus